Robin Friend (born 1983) is a British-Australian photographer. His book Bastard Countryside (2018), brought together "15 years worth of exploration" the British Landscape with a large format view camera. Included in this publication by Loose Joints is an essay the landscape writer Robert Macfarlane.

Life  
Friend was born in London, UK, but from an early age lived in Melbourne, Australia. He returned to live in England permanently with this family when he was 14. He went on to study photography at the University of Plymouth and the Royal College of Art. He has two children with his partner Seren Colley and they live in the town of Lewes, East Sussex.

Work

Bastard Countryside
Robin Friend's Bastard Countryside is an amalgamation of 15 years worth of work, journeying across the English countryside. Originally made for separate, unrelated projects, the pictures that make up this extensive body of work in time fused together to form this single, more expansive project. Published by Loose Joints in 2018. The title, Bastard Countryside, was a term first coined by French poet and novelist Victor Hugo in Les Misérables whilst describing the "city of Paris as an “amphibian”, stretching out into the countryside and devouring everything in its path", “somewhat ugly but bizarre, made up of two different natures.”

The project deals with the idea of the collision of the human and non-human. Through the meticulous use of his 5x4 large format view camera the photographs “are given heightened effect through exaggerations of colour and composition, embodying a friction between British pastoral ideals and present reality.”  Within scenes that feel like traditional landscapes, our ideas of it are intruded, often by pollution, decay and WWII debris in this “mixed-up meeting-zone of rural and urban; where city frays into country."

Friend says “I see it almost as an anxious nature. We're all anxious about what the future holds and I feel like that is inherent in a lot of the pictures. I think that you couldn't be a human without being worried about the kind of planet we're leaving to our children.”

Winged Bull in the Elephant Case
Winged Bull in the Elephant Case “is an immersive performance for the screen about preserving our cultural heritage in the face of violence and aggression." At the start of the Second World War, the National Gallery's art collection was buried in the Manod slate mines in Snowdonia for safe keeping. Winged Bull in the Elephant Case “dramatises the journey of a lost painting that takes human form, as it strives to get back to the gallery." This engaging piece combines various dance forms and was filmed underground in the National Gallery. The work  features choreography by Wayne McGregor, Charlotte Edmonds, Botis Seva and Bonetics, performed by Company Wayne McGregor, Alessandra Ferri, Bonetics, and Far From The Norm. The production was written and directed by Robin Friend.

He had his first solo show at the National Gallery of London in 2018. It coincided with a film piece called Winged Bull in the Elephant Case he wrote and directed, as  a collaboration with the choreographer Wayne McGregor. It told the story of the National Gallery during World War II when the galleries collection was hidden in a slate mine in North Wales. His ongoing project Bonfire Prayers explores what happens on Bonfire night in the town of Lewes, East Sussex. Commissions

In 2011 he photographed 120 artists for the Thames & Hudson book Sanctuary: British Artists and their Studios.   The book was followed  by Art Studio America in 2013, d documenting the private worlds of 115 Americant living artists.

Publications

Bastard Countryside  – published by Loose Joints with an essay by Robert Macfarlane.

Awards

 2019 Emerging Photographer Fund Finalist
 2018    Royal Photographic Society Environmental Bursary
 2016 Syngenta Award, Open winner
 2011 reGeneration Award
 2009 The Photographers Gallery Award
 2009 Winner, Merlin Entertainment/Tussaud's Award for Fine Art

Exhibitions

Solo exhibitions 

 2018 Manod: The Nation's Treasure Caves, National Gallery, London

Group exhibitions 

 2020 Festival ImageSingulières, Sete
 2019 The Summer Exhibition, Royal Academy of Arts, London
 2019	Royal Photographic Society International Photography Exhibition 161, Bristol
 2017 Syngenta Award, Somerset House, London
 2016	The Summer Exhibition, Royal Academy of Arts, London
 2015	Demimonde, Amberwood House, London
 2015	The Summer Exhibition, Royal Academy of Arts, London
 2015	London's Burning, ICA, London
 2013	Rosphoto, Saint Petersburg
 2013 	With Sorrow Snare, solo show, Zero10, London
 2012 	Taylor Wessing, National Portrait Gallery, London
 2012 	Immortal Nature, Edel Assanti, London
 2011 	Ghosts & Nightmares, Historial de la Grande Guerre, Péronne
 2011 	reGeneration, Aperture Gallery, New York
 2011 	Spirit Level, Go Modern, London
 2010 	reGeneration, Musee de l'Elysee, Lausanne

Collections
Friend's work is held in the:
 Martin Parr Foundation
 Eisler Foundation

References

1983 births
Living people
British photographers